Gunnera aequatoriensis is a species of plant in the family Gunneraceae. It is endemic to Ecuador.  Its natural habitat is subtropical or tropical moist montane forests.

References

Flora of Ecuador
aequatoriensis
Vulnerable plants
Taxonomy articles created by Polbot